Limnotrochus is a monotypic genus in the family Paludomidae containing the single species Limnotrochus thomsoni, a tropical freshwater snail with gills and an operculum, aquatic gastropod mollusk. It is endemic to Lake Tanganyika.

The specific name thomsoni is in honor of explorer Joseph Thomson.

Distribution 
Limnotrochus thomsoni is endemic to Lake Tanganyika and is found in all countries surrounding the lake: Burundi, the Democratic Republic of the Congo, Tanzania, and Zambia. The type locality is Lake Tanganyika.

Description 
The shell measures 14 mm in width and 19 mm in height.

Ecology and threats
Limnotrochus thomsoni lives in depths 4–30 m on silt and sandy bottoms of Lake Tanganyika. It is potentially threatened by sedimentation.

References

Further reading 
 

Paludomidae
Monotypic gastropod genera
Freshwater snails of Africa
Snails of Lake Tanganyika
Gastropods described in 1880
Taxa named by Edgar Albert Smith
Taxonomy articles created by Polbot